Felix Liebrecht (13 March 1812 – 3 August 1890) was a German folklorist.

Biography
Liebrecht was born in Namslau, Prussian Silesia. He studied philology at the universities of Breslau, Munich, and Berlin, and in 1851 became professor of the German language at the Athénée Royal at Liège, Belgium. He resigned his chair and retired into private life in 1867. He died in Saint-Hubert, Belgium.

Works
Translations by Liebrecht include:
Giambattista Basile's Pentamerone, with introduction by Jakob Grimm (1846).
Johannes Damascenus's Barlaam und Josaphat (1847).
John Colin Dunlop's Geschichte der Prosadichtungen (1851).
an edition of Gervasius of Tilbury's Otia Imperialia (1856).
George Cornewall Lewis's Untersuchungen über die Glaubwürdigkeit der altrömischen Geschichte (2 volumes, 1858).

A collection of original essays by him was published at Heilbronn in 1879, under the title Zur Volkskunde.

References
 Meyers Konversations-Lexikon

External links
 
 

1812 births
1890 deaths
People from Namysłów
19th-century German Jews
People from the Province of Silesia
German folklorists
University of Breslau alumni
Ludwig Maximilian University of Munich alumni
Humboldt University of Berlin alumni
German male non-fiction writers